Alden Taylor (Tad) Mann, (born August 18, 1943, in Auburn, New York) is an American astrologer, author, designer and artist who has written 18 books and is best known for his books and paintings on astrology and sacred architecture, sexuality and gardens.

Architecture

Mann graduated from the Cornell University College of Architecture in 1966 and worked as an architect for Gruzen & Partners, Davis Brody Associates, and Robert A. M. Stern in New York City and The Architects' Collaborative (TAC) European office in Rome.

In 1970, Mann and Stuart Cohen as principal designers at Gruzen & Partners Architects won a Progressive Architecture Magazine Design Awards Citation for "Low Income Public Housing for Queens, New York" (January 1970, pp. 98–99), Annual Awards Issue.

Astrology

Mann has written many astrology books based on the concept of a logarithmic time scale derived from the work of G. I. Gurdjieff, P. D. Ouspensky and Rodney Collin, and contributing to an application of astrology called Life Time Astrology.

Mann lived in England from 1973 to 1991 and in Copenhagen from 1991 to 1999. He regularly taught at the UK Astrological Association in London, and the Unicorn School of Astro-psychology and the Scandinavian Astrologi Skole in Copenhagen.

Mann is one of the more prolific astrological authors, and he designed and illustrated most of his own books. From 1973 to 1980, Mann was a founding partner of Phenomenon Publications in London, and co-wrote, designed and illustrated The Phenomenon Book of Calendars that were published in the UK and US yearly for eight years.  He wrote The Round Art: The Astrology of Time and Space (1979), Life Time Astrology (1984), The Divine Plot: Astrology and Reincarnation (1986), The Future of Astrology (1988) collection of essays by important astrologers, Astrology and the Art of Healing (1989) and A New Vision of Astrology (2002).

Mann also designed, painted and wrote The Mandala Astrological Tarot (1987), published by Harper & Row San Francisco, and Elements of the Tarot (1995). He wrote Sacred Architecture (1993) and Sacred Sexuality (1995) with the author and master of divinatory tarot Jane Lyle. He has also written many articles and essays for other books. Mann's mandala paintings and designs are featured in Masters of the 20th Century: The ICOGRADA Design Hall of Fame.

Mann now lives and works in Ithaca, New York, has worked in the past with Mystic Fire Video, particularly as editor and voiceover for the Dalai Lama's Kalachakra Tantra Teachings (2009). His current book Sacred Landscapes with photographs by Lynn Davis was published by Sterling Publishers in New York. Mann also writes for the online Oracular Masters Series at the website tarot.com, particularly about his Mandala Astrological Tarot, as well as a Reincarnation Report, an Astro Location Feng Shui report, and the Solar Return report.

Select books
A T Mann, The Sacred Language of Trees (2012 Sterling, New York) 
A T Mann, Sacred Landscapes: The Threshold Between Worlds with photographs by Lynn Davis (2010, Sterling, New York) 
A T Mann, Mandalas by A. T. Mann: 2011 Calendar (Pomegranate Communications, Petaluma, California) 
A T Mann, The Mandala Astrological Tarot (2009, Sterling, New York) 
A T Mann, A New Vision of Astrology (2002, Pocket Books/Simon & Schuster, New York)  Still in print.
A T Mann' The Divine Life: Astrology and Reincarnation (2003, Vega, London) 
A T Mann and Jane Lyle, Sacred Sexuality (1995, Element Books, Shaftesbury; Barnes & Noble, Book of the Month Club, New York; 2002, Vega, London) 
A T Mann, Elements of Reincarnation (1995, Element Books) 
A T Mann  Sacred Architecture (1993, Element Books; 1996 Barnes & Noble, New York) 
A T Mann, The Elements of the Tarot (1993, Element Books) 
A T Mann, Millennium Prophecies (1992, Element Books, Shaftesbury)  
A T Mann, The Divine Plot: Astrology, Reincarnation, Cosmology and History (1986, Allen & Unwin, 1991, Element Books) 
A T Mann, Astrology and the Art of Healing (1989, Unwin Paperbacks, London, Sydney, Wellington) 
A T Mann, The Future of Astrology (1989, Unwin Hyman, London, Sydney) 
A T Mann, Life Time Astrology (1984, George Allen & Unwin, London; 1991, Element Books, Shaftesbury) 
A T Mann, The Round Art: The Astrology of time and Space (1978, Paper Tiger/Dragon's World, Cheltenham; 1978, Mayflower, New York) 2003 Vega, London 
A T Mann, Sesti, Cowen & Flanagan, The Phenomenon Book of Calendars 1979–1980, (1979, Phenomenon Publications, London; Dragon's World, Brighton)  Doubleday, New York.

References

External links
 "A.T.Mann's Sacred Arts" personal website
"The World's Billionaires: Billionaire Horoscopes" by Lacey Rose and Chaniga Vorasarun, Forbes.com, March 28, 2006, retrieved September 17, 2006
Review of "Sacred Landscapes" by A. T. Mann on HeadButler.com
Rose Window geometry studies, Painton Cowen's book "Rose Windows"
Astro-Databank

1943 births
Living people
20th-century astrologers
21st-century astrologers
American astrologers
American male writers
Cornell University College of Architecture, Art, and Planning alumni
Artists from Auburn, New York
Architects from New York (state)